Graham Horn (23 August 1954 – 29 June 2012) was an English professional footballer who played as a goalkeeper.

Career
Born in Westminster, Horn was active in both England and the United States, and made over 150 career league appearances for Arsenal, Portsmouth, Luton Town, Brentford, the Los Angeles Aztecs, Charlton Athletic, Kettering Town, Southend United, Aldershot, Torquay United and Barnstaple Town.

Later life
He died on 29 June 2012, aged 57.

References

1954 births
2012 deaths
English footballers
Arsenal F.C. players
Portsmouth F.C. players
Luton Town F.C. players
Brentford F.C. players
Los Angeles Aztecs players
Charlton Athletic F.C. players
Kettering Town F.C. players
Southend United F.C. players
Aldershot F.C. players
Torquay United F.C. players
Barnstaple Town F.C. players
English Football League players
North American Soccer League (1968–1984) players
Association football goalkeepers
English expatriate sportspeople in the United States
Expatriate soccer players in the United States
English expatriate footballers